Delaware's 20th Senate district is one of 21 districts in the Delaware Senate. It has been represented by Republican Gerald Hocker, the current Senate Minority Leader, since 2012.

Geography
District 20 is based in southeastern Sussex County along the Atlantic Ocean, including the communities of Millsboro, Selbyville, Ocean View, Bethany Beach, Dagsboro, Frankford, Fenwick Island, Millville, South Bethany, Roxana, and Oak Orchard. It borders the state of Maryland.

Like all districts in the state, the 20th Senate district is located entirely within Delaware's at-large congressional district. It overlaps with the 37th, 38th, and 41st districts of the Delaware House of Representatives.

Recent election results
Delaware Senators are elected to staggered four-year terms. Under normal circumstances, the 20th district holds elections in presidential years, except immediately after redistricting, when all seats are up for election regardless of usual cycle.

2020

2016

2012

Federal and statewide results in District 20

References 

20
Sussex County, Delaware